Red Ears (Dutch: Rooie Oortjes, French: Blagues Coquines) is a Belgian adult comic book series launched by Dany in 1990. He started with commercial drawings and then moved on to comics. The series is published by Joker Editions.

Concept

The books consist of several one-page-long gag-a-day comics, sometimes gag cartoons too, about women and men in erotic situations, usually nude or almost nude. It can be classified as dirty jokes, black comedy and soft pornography. , 25 books  have been published in the series by various cartoonists and script writers. Dany drew the first six books under the name "Ca vous intéresse?" ("Does that interest you"). The series has no recurring characters.

Contributors
 Edouard Aidans (under the pen name "Hardan") 
 Dany 
 Bob de Groot 
 Bruno Di Sano
 Didgé (under the pen name "Bloody") 
 Gürcan Gürsel
 Hermann 
 Josep Marti
 Jean-Claire Stibane (under the pen name "Gutsy") 
 Tibet 
 Tino

See also
 Dany

References

External links
 Rooie Oortjes in Dutch
 Dany

Belgian comic strips
Belgian comics titles
Bandes dessinées
Erotic comics
Comics about women
1990 comics debuts
Gag-a-day comics
Gag cartoon comics
Adult humour titles
Comic franchises